John Timothy Akers is an American author of speculative fiction. He writes as Tim Akers.

Life
John Timothy Akers was born in rural Buncombe County, North Carolina, the only son of John Nance Akers, a theologian. He moved to Chicago, Illinois for college, and has resided that area since. He is married.

Writing career
Akers has been active in the speculative fiction field since 2004. His work has appeared in various periodicals and anthologies, including Apex Magazine, ChiZine, Clarkesworld Magazine, Electric Velocipede, Interzone, The Solaris Book of New Science Fiction, Volume Three, Strange Horizons, and Transmissions from Beyond.

Bibliography

Burn Cycle
Heart of Veridon (2009)
Dead of Veridon (2011)
Bones of Veridon (collection) (2013)

The Hallowed War
The Pagan Night (2016)
The Iron Hound (2017)
The Winter Vow (2018)

Other novels
 The Horns of Ruin (2010)
Knight Watch (2020)

Short stories

Nonfiction

Awards
The Pagan Night was a preliminary nominee for the 2017 Gemmell Award.

References

1972 births
Living people
21st-century American novelists
American speculative fiction writers
Novelists from North Carolina
American male novelists
21st-century American male writers